"Cousins" is the first single from Vampire Weekend's second album Contra. It was recorded by the band in Mexico City and debuted a few days later in Guadalajara. The single was released November 17, 2009 and a 7" was released December 15, 2009.

Music video 
The video for the song, directed by Garth Jennings, debuted on MTVu on November 19, 2009.

The video features the members of Vampire Weekend performing in a long alleyway. Throughout the song, the members of the band rotate places on a platform that moves up and down the alleyway on a track. While some of the band members are on the platform, the others take positions beside the platform. The band members also exchange masks of one another, wearing them whilst singing. Towards the end of the video, confetti starts raining down on the alley.

Stereogum describes the video as "quick, quirky, and unpredictable but not without a sense of humour about itself, so pretty much perfect for a band of Ivy Leaguers who aren't above self-satirizing their prepped up ways."

Track listing

Personnel
Vampire Weekend
 Ezra Koenig – lead vocals, guitar
 Rostam Batmanglij – piano, background vocals, vocal harmonies, keyboards, harpsichord, VSS-30, drum, synth, sampler programming, guitar
 Christopher Tomson – drums
 Chris Baio – bass

Technical
 Rostam Batmanglij – mixing, engineering
 Justin Gerrish – mixing
 Tito Fuentes – engineering
 Melchor M – engineering assistance
 Emily Lazar – mastering
 Joe LaPorta – assistant mastering engineering

Chart performance 

Following Contra'''s release on January 11, 2010, "Cousins" began to receive increasing amounts of digital downloads. The single first entered the UK Singles Chart on January 17, 2010, where it reached a current peak of #39. It entered the UK Indie charts at #3.

 Use in other media 

Cousins is used in the opening sequence of the 2010 film, The Kids Are All Right, although the song does not appear on the soundtrack release. It also appears in Pro Evolution Soccer 2011'' as a soundtrack.  It was also covered by the British indie folk band Mumford & Sons. It is also available for purchase as DLC for Guitar Hero games, and is featured in Guitar Hero for iOS.

References

2009 songs
Vampire Weekend songs
XL Recordings singles
2009 singles